Neopanax laetus, the shrub panax, is a species of flowering plant in the subfamily Aralioideae, family Araliaceae, native to the North Island of New Zealand. It has gained the Royal Horticultural Society's Award of Garden Merit.

References

External links

Araliaceae
Endemic flora of New Zealand
Flora of the North Island
Plants described in 1961